There are two communities named New Burlington in Ohio, the United States:

New Burlington, Clinton County, Ohio, a former village
New Burlington, Hamilton County, Ohio, a census-designated place